Lieutenant general Douangchay Phichit (5 April 1944 – 17 May 2014) was a Laotian politician from Attapeu and a Politburo member of the Lao People's Revolutionary Party (from the 7th Congress of the Lao People's Revolutionary Party until his death). He served as the Deputy Prime Minister and Minister of National Defense.

On 17 May 2014, Phichit and his wife, Lieutenant Colonel Mrs Thanda Phichit, died when the plane he was traveling on crashed in northern Laos.

References

1944 births
2014 deaths
Deputy Prime Ministers of Laos
Defense Ministers of Laos
People from Attapeu province
Members of the 5th Central Committee of the Lao People's Revolutionary Party
Members of the 6th Central Committee of the Lao People's Revolutionary Party
Members of the 7th Central Committee of the Lao People's Revolutionary Party
Members of the 8th Central Committee of the Lao People's Revolutionary Party
Members of the 9th Central Committee of the Lao People's Revolutionary Party
Members of the 7th Politburo of the Lao People's Revolutionary Party
Members of the 8th Politburo of the Lao People's Revolutionary Party
Members of the 9th Politburo of the Lao People's Revolutionary Party
Members of the 8th Executive Committee of the Lao People's Revolutionary Party
Lao People's Revolutionary Party politicians
Victims of aviation accidents or incidents in Laos
Laotian military leaders